Brajković, is a family name from Bosnia and Herzegovina, Croatia, Montenegro, and Serbia. A patronymic derived from the Slavic given name Brajko. It is transcribed as Brajkovič in Slovenia.
The first written record about Brajković's is from the 15th century in Grbalj, Montenegro. Croatian Brajković's are migrated from Grbalj and Boka during the Ottoman rule in Montenegro.
It may refer to:

Dragomir Brajković (1947–2009), Serbian writer and journalist
Elvis Brajković (born 1969), retired Croatian football player
Goran Brajković (born 1978), Croatian football player
Ivana Brajković (born 1993), Serbian basketball player
Janez Brajkovič (born 1983), Slovenian racing cyclist
Jasna Šekarić née Brajković (born 1965), Serbian sports shooter and Olympic medalist
Luka Brajkovic (born 1999), Austrian basketball player
Mate Brajković (born 1981), Croatian football player

See also
 Brajkovići (disambiguation)

Serbian surnames
Croatian surnames